Salvatore: Shoemaker of Dreams is a 2020 Italian English-language documentary film directed by Luca Guadagnino. It revolves around the life of Salvatore Ferragamo.

It had its world premiere at the Venice Film Festival on September 5, 2020. It will be released in the United States on November 4, 2022.

Production
In January 2019, it was announced Guadagnino would direct a documentary revolving around the life of Salvatore Ferragamo. In March 2020, Guadagnino stated the film was in post-production.

Release
The film had its world premiere at the Venice Film Festival on September 5, 2020. Prior to its premiere, Sony Pictures Classics acquired worldwide distribution rights to the film, excluding Italy. They will release the film in the United States on November 4, 2022.

References

External links

2020 documentary films
2020 films
Documentary films about fashion designers
Films directed by Luca Guadagnino
Italian documentary films
Sony Pictures Classics films
2020s English-language films
2020s Italian films
Cultural depictions of Italian men